Iving may refer to:
Intravenous therapy, "IV-ing"
Alternate spelling of Ifing, a river in Norse mythology